British Consul may refer to:

The Consul who represents Great Britain in various foreign countries
, a tanker sunk during the Second World War